Terrace Park Girl Scout Cabin, also known as the Big Stone Gap Girl Scout Cabin, is a historic Girl Scouts of the United States of America clubhouse at Big Stone Gap, Wise County, Virginia. It was built in 1938 by the National Youth Administration.  It is a one-story, five room log building constructed of large, round pine logs. It has a low gable roof and exterior end chimneys constructed of cobblestone.  It was used by the Girl Scouts until 1943, after which it was acquired by Big Stone Gap as a rental facility for public events.

It was listed on the National Register of Historic Places in 2007.

See also
 Scouting in Virginia

References

Log cabins in the United States
Works Progress Administration in Virginia
Clubhouses on the National Register of Historic Places in Virginia
Houses completed in 1938
Buildings and structures in Wise County, Virginia
National Register of Historic Places in Wise County, Virginia
Log buildings and structures on the National Register of Historic Places in Virginia
National Youth Administration
Girl Scouts of the USA
Scout halls